Pleocoma hirticollis is a species of rain beetle in the family Pleocomidae. It is found in North America.

Subspecies
These three subspecies belong to the species Pleocoma hirticollis:
 Pleocoma hirticollis hirticollis Schaufuss, 1870
 Pleocoma hirticollis reflexa Hovore, 1972
 Pleocoma hirticollis vandykei Linsley, 1938

References

Further reading

 

scarabaeiformia
Articles created by Qbugbot
Beetles described in 1870